Carl R. Trueman (born 1967) is a Christian theologian and ecclesiastical historian. He was Professor of Historical Theology and Church History at Westminster Theological Seminary, where he held the Paul Woolley Chair of Church History. In 2018 Trueman resigned his position at Westminster to become a full-time undergraduate professor at Grove City College, serving as Full Professor in their Department of Biblical and Religious Studies as of the fall semester of that same year.

Among Trueman's books are John Owen: Reformed Catholic, Renaissance Man,The Creedal Imperative, Fools Rush in Where Monkeys Fear to Tread: Taking Aim at Everyone, and Republocrat: Confessions of a Liberal Conservative. In 2020, Trueman published what is probably his most popular and widely read book, The Rise and Triumph of the Modern Self: Cultural Amnesia, Expressive Individualism, and the Road to Sexual Revolution. His most recent book, Strange New World: How Thinkers and Activists Redefined Identity and Sparked the Sexual Revolution, is a condensed version of his previous book. He contributes to First Things (Journal of Religion and Public Life) blogs regularly at Reformation21 and co-hosts the Mortification of Spin podcast. 

Trueman is an ordained minister in the Orthodox Presbyterian Church, and was the pastor of Cornerstone OPC in Ambler, Pennsylvania.

Trueman studied at Marling School, Gloucestershire, St Catharine's College, Cambridge and the University of Aberdeen, and previously taught at the University of Aberdeen and the University of Nottingham. He was editor of Themelios from 1998 to 2007, and is a council member of the Alliance of Confessing Evangelicals. Trueman is a fellow in Ethics and Public Policy Center’s Evangelicals in Civic Life Program.

In 2022 he appeared in documentary What Is a Woman?

References

Living people
1967 births
20th-century Calvinist and Reformed theologians
21st-century Calvinist and Reformed theologians
Academic journal editors
Academics of the University of Aberdeen
Academics of the University of Nottingham
Alumni of St Catharine's College, Cambridge
Alumni of the University of Aberdeen
American Calvinist and Reformed theologians
American historians of religion
Christian bloggers
Editors of Christian publications
Historians of Christianity
Orthodox Presbyterian Church ministers
Westminster Theological Seminary faculty
Ethics and Public Policy Center